Shaking the Tree is a 1990 compilation album by rock musician Peter Gabriel.

Shaking the Tree may also refer to:
 Shaking the Tree (film), a 1990 comedy-drama by Duane Clark
 "Shaking the Tree" (Powers), a 2016 episode of the television series Powers